Justin Murray (born April 19, 1993) is an American football offensive tackle for the Las Vegas Raiders of the National Football League (NFL). Murray played high school football at Sycamore High School in Cincinnati. While in high school, Murray set the Greater Miami Conference shot put record at 59'06.5". He played college football at Cincinnati, and was signed by the Denver Broncos as an undrafted free agent in 2016. Murray has also played for the Tampa Bay Buccaneers, New Orleans Saints, Cincinnati Bengals, and Oakland Raiders.

Professional career

Denver Broncos
Murray signed with the Denver Broncos as an undrafted free agent on May 2, 2016. He was waived on September 3, 2016 and was signed to the practice squad the next day. After spending the entire season on the practice squad, Murray signed a reserve/future contract with the Broncos.

On September 2, 2017, Murray was waived by the Broncos.

Tampa Bay Buccaneers
On September 6, 2017, Murray was signed to the Tampa Bay Buccaneers' practice squad. He was released by the Buccaneers on November 22, 2017.

New Orleans Saints
On December 4, 2017, Murray was signed to the New Orleans Saints' practice squad.

Cincinnati Bengals
On December 20, 2017, Murray was signed by the Cincinnati Bengals off the Saints' practice squad.

On September 1, 2018, Murray was waived by the Bengals.

Oakland Raiders
On September 2, 2018, Murray was claimed off waivers by the Oakland Raiders.

On August 31, 2019, Murray was waived by the Raiders.

Arizona Cardinals
On September 1, 2019, Murray was claimed off waivers by the Arizona Cardinals. He started 12 games at right tackle for the Cardinals in 2019.

Murray re-signed with the Cardinals on a one-year exclusive-rights free agent tender on April 2, 2020. He signed a two-year contract extension with the Cardinals on October 2, 2020.

On October 8, 2021, Murray was placed on injured reserve after suffering a back injury in Week 3.

On August 30, 2022, Murray was released by the Cardinals.

Buffalo Bills
On September 27, 2022, Murray signed a one-year contract with the Buffalo Bills. He was released on January 12, 2023, and re-signed to the practice squad.

Las Vegas Raiders
On February 2, 2023, Murray signed a reserve/future contract with the Las Vegas Raiders.

References

External links
Tampa Bay Buccaneers bio

1993 births
Living people
Players of American football from Cincinnati
American football offensive tackles
Denver Broncos players
Tampa Bay Buccaneers players
New Orleans Saints players
Cincinnati Bengals players
Oakland Raiders players
Arizona Cardinals players
Buffalo Bills players
Las Vegas Raiders players